Natasha's Waltz is a compilation album of American guitarist Norman Blake, released in 1987. It contains all of the tracks from the vinyl release Original Underground Music from the Mysterious South, along with six tracks from Full Moon on the Farm and two tracks from Rising Fawn String Ensemble. The cover is the same as Original Underground Music from the Mysterious South.

Track listing
 "New Brick Road" – 3:33
 "Dusty Rose" – 3:50
 "Walnut River" – 2:22
 "Pig on the Engine" – 2:50
 "Third Street Gypsy Rag" – 3:03
 "Georgia Home" – 2:59
 "Peezlewhister" – 3:44
 "Old Fiddler's Roll Call" – 2:10
 "Pueblo" – 2:44
 "The Toneality" – 3:33
 "Natasha's Waltz" – 4:08
 "Blake's March" – 2:28
 "Texola Waltz" – 1:56
 "Diamonds in the Rough" – 4:03
 "Jeff Davis" – 2:42
 "Nancy's Hornpipe" – 3:28
 "Three Ravens" – 1:59
 "Sleepy-Eyed Joe" – 3:01
 "Cairo Waltz" – 2:00
 "Davenport March" – 3:33
 "Obc, No. 3	 Blake" – 5:49

Personnel
Norman Blake – vocals, banjo, fiddle, guitar, mandolin, mandocello, tenor banjo
Nancy Blake – fiddle, mandolin, accordion, cello, vocals
James Bryan – fiddle
Charlie Collins – fiddle, guitar
Carl Jones – banjo, guitar, mandolin, mandola, tenor banjo
Peter Ostroushko – fiddle, guitar, mandolin

References

Norman Blake (American musician) albums
Peter Ostroushko albums
1987 compilation albums